Adelaide Avenue School is a historic school building located at Canandaigua in Ontario County, New York. It was built about 1890 and is a one-story, polychrome brick structure on a raised basement.  It features a variety of picturesque late 19th century decorative features in the Queen Anne style, such as a multi-gabled roof surmounted by a louvred cupola. It is a typical example of a late 19th-century ward school, along with the Saltonstall Street School.

It was listed on the National Register of Historic Places in 1984.

Gallery

References

School buildings on the National Register of Historic Places in New York (state)
Queen Anne architecture in New York (state)
1890s architecture in the United States
Buildings and structures in Ontario County, New York
National Register of Historic Places in Ontario County, New York